Ismael Saibari Ben El Basra (born 28 January 2001) is a professional footballer who plays as an attacking midfielder for Dutch Eredivisie club PSV Eindhoven. Born in Spain, he is a youth international for Morocco.

International career
Born in Spain, Saibari is of Moroccan descent. He moved to Belgium at a young age. He is a youth international for Morocco.

Career statistics

Club

Honours
PSV Eindhoven
 KNVB Cup: 2021–22
 Johan Cruyff Shield: 2022

References

External links
 Profile at the PSV Eindhoven website

2001 births
Living people
Moroccan footballers
Morocco youth international footballers
Spanish footballers
Spanish sportspeople of Moroccan descent
Moroccan expatriate footballers
Spanish expatriate footballers
Association football midfielders
K Beerschot VA players
R.S.C. Anderlecht players
K.R.C. Genk players
PSV Eindhoven players
Jong PSV players
Eerste Divisie players
Eredivisie players
Moroccan expatriate sportspeople in Belgium
Spanish expatriate sportspeople in Belgium
Expatriate footballers in Belgium
Moroccan expatriate sportspeople in the Netherlands
Spanish expatriate sportspeople in the Netherlands
Expatriate footballers in the Netherlands